Santa Cruz de las Flores is the name of a town located south of Tlajomulco de Zuñiga, in the state of Jalisco, Mexico. It has been called Xochitlan, meaning "Place of Flowers" (xōchitl is Nahuatl for flower ).

History
In this village there is a chapel-hospital, built between the 16th and 18th centuries, with a façade baroque Regional. This is one of the greatest treasures of art in Jalisco, and is in the Ruta Franciscana.

Which houses the Club Deportivo Cardinals with a rich history over the years and Soccer leagues Guadalajara area and regional leagues.

Santa Cruz is one of the fastest-growing towns in the municipality of Tlajomulco de Zuniga, a town with an influx urbanization in recent years through a transition from a village to a local metropolitan area, due to growth area, and its various businesses, subdivisions, shopping centers as well as the remodeling of the streets.
Today already has direct truck route to Guadalajara for better comfort.

Medicine
Santa Cruz de las Flores is a town with a vast amount of improvements in the medical field. Dating back many decades, the people of the town have been successful in creating new advancements of home remedies. Farmacia Camino Real is one of the few pharmacies in Santa Cruz de las Flores where you can find modern medicine.

Populated places in Jalisco